Sibongile Jeremia Besani is a South African politician who served as a Member of the National Assembly of South Africa between May and July 2019. Besani is a member of the African National Congress.

Political career
Besani is a member of the African National Congress. He is a current member of the party's National Executive Committee. He is also a former secretary of the party's Free State branch.

In May 2019, he was elected and sworn in as a Member of the National Assembly of South Africa. On 1 July 2019, he became head of the party's presidency based at Luthuli House. Besani resigned from parliament with effect from 5 July 2019. Later that month, he was appointed coordinator of the national task team responsible for the African National Congress Youth League, after its leadership structure was dissolved. In February 2020, he offered to resign from the position. The ANC rejected his resignation.

References

Living people
Year of birth missing (living people)
People from the Free State (province)
African National Congress politicians
Members of the National Assembly of South Africa